Anteo Fetahu (born 10 July 2002) is a professional footballer who plays as a forward for Austrian club BW Linz.

Club career
Fetahu joined Blau-Weiß Linz in June 2021.

International career
Fetahu has represented Albania at youth international level.

Career statistics

Club

References

2002 births
Living people
Albanian footballers
Albania youth international footballers
German footballers
Association football forwards
2. Liga (Austria) players
FC Ingolstadt 04 players
SG Quelle Fürth players
SpVgg Greuther Fürth players
FC Blau-Weiß Linz players
Albanian expatriate footballers
German expatriate footballers
Albanian expatriate sportspeople in Austria
German expatriate sportspeople in Austria
Expatriate footballers in Austria